"Deep Freeze" is a song by Japanese singer-songwriter Rina Aiuchi. It was released on 20 November 2002 through Giza Studio, as the second single from her third studio album A.I.R.. The song reached number three in Japan and has sold over 69,348 copies nationwide. The song served as the theme song to the Japanese television shows, Pro no Domyaku and Ax Music-TV.

Track listing

Charts

Weekly charts

Certification and sales

|-
! scope="row"| Japan (RIAJ)
| 
| 69,348
|-
|}

Release history

References

2002 singles
2002 songs
J-pop songs
Song recordings produced by Daiko Nagato
Songs written by Rina Aiuchi